The Unexpected World is the debut album by German progressive metal band, Tomorrow's Eve, released in 2000. Upon its release, the album garnered a fair amount of positive press.

Track listing 
 "Intro" (0:20)
 "Success" (6:50)
 "Voyager" (8:47)
 "Outside" (3:08)
 "Silent Dream" (0:34)
 "Changes" (12:27)
 "Descent Into Insanity" (7:40)
 "Conflict" (6:24)
 "The Unexpected World" (0:59)

Musicians 
Peter Webel – vocals
Rainer Grund – guitars
Oliver Schwickert – keyboards
Sascha Hilles – bass
Ralf Gottlieb – drums, percussion

Tomorrow's Eve (band) albums
2000 debut albums